Teterville is a ghost town in Greenwood County, Kansas, United States.  It is located approximately 11 miles east of Cassoday.  No buildings remain of this former community.

History
Teterville was founded as an "oil town" sometime after the Teeter Oil Field was discovered around 1920.  The oil field was named in honor of James Teter who owned about 6900 acres of land in Greenwood County.  A post office was opened in Teterville in 1927, and remained in operation until it was discontinued in 1962.

Points of interest
 Teter Rock. It is accessible by the public using a rural road on private land, so please respect the property. In 1954, the current monument was erected by the Greenwood County Historical Society  to replace the earlier landmark created in the 1870s or 1880s by James Wesley Teter (1849-1929).

See also
 Salem Township, Greenwood County, Kansas (location of Teterville)
 Teter, West Virginia (founded by relatives of James Teter)

References

Further reading

 My Flint Hills Childhood: Growing Up in 1930s Kansas; Gail Lee Martin; 186 pages; 2009.

External links
 Teterville, Teter Oil Fields, and Teter Rock
 Teterville and Teter Rock
 James Teter biography
 Greenwood County maps: Current, Historic, KDOT

Geography of Greenwood County, Kansas